Dyllan McGee is a documentary filmmaker and founder of McGee Media. In partnership with Peter Kunhardt, McGee produced "Gloria: In Her Own Words” (HBO), “Finding Your Roots with Henry Louis Gates Jr.” (PBS),  "MAKERS: Women Who Make America” and many more. McGee is the Founder and Executive Producer of AOL's MAKERS.

Her films include the documentary, Gloria: In Her Own Words (HBO), The African Americans: Many Rivers to Cross (PBS); Teddy: In His Own Words (HBO); Faces of America with Henry Louis Gates Jr. (PBS); This Emotional Life (PBS); African American Lives (PBS); Oprah’s Roots (PBS); and In Memoriam; 9/11/01 (HBO). McGee was the Founding Executive Director of the Meserve Kunhardt Foundation and the Gordon Parks Foundation. From 2003 to 2005 Dyllan served as the Director of Content and Operations for the International Freedom Center on Ground Zero in New York, a cultural institution that was proposed as part of the Lower Manhattan Development Corporation's redevelopment of the World Trade Center site. [1] [2]

McGee is the recipient of many awards including two Emmy awards, a DuPont Journalism award, a Peabody award, the New York Women in Communications Matrix Award, and Planned Parenthood’s Women of Valor award. She also served on the Board of Directors for The Taft School from 1997 to 2007.  She lives in Katonah, NY with her husband and two boys.

Filmography

See also
Makers: Women Who Make America

References

External links
 

American television producers
Year of birth missing (living people)
Living people